The Lezama Facilities, is the training ground and academy of the Primera Division club Athletic Bilbao. Located in the Lezama village around 10 km east of Bilbao, it was opened in 1971.

Lezama hosts Athletic's first team for training and the league matches of Athletic EFT (women's team), as well as ten base youth teams: Bilbao Athletic (reserve team, currently playing at the Segunda División B level), women's B team, two junior teams (17 to 19 years old), two cadets (with ages between 15 and 16), two youngster teams (13 and 14) and three children's teams (the youngest, 11 and 12 years of age) which make up the club's football academy. In June 2021, the facilities also became the home ground of Segunda División newcomers SD Amorebieta as their home stadium Urritxe was deemed "impractical" to play in the category.

Currently, the total area of the facilities is 14,760 m².

Facilities

Field 2 with a capacity of 3,250 seats, is the home stadium of Bilbao Athletic, the reserve team of Athletic Bilbao, and the club's senior women's team. It is also home to SD Amorebieta, who in 2021 reached an agreement with Athletic Club to play at the stadium as their pitch, Urritxe, did not meet Segunda División requirements
 4 full-size natural grass pitches including Field 1, the senior team's training zone and Field 5, used by the Juvenil (under-19) academy teams.
 3 full-size artificial turf pitches including Field 8 used by the women's B team.
 1 mini football artificial turf pitch.
 Service centre with gymnasium, press rooms and medical facilities.
 Athletes' residence.

The Arch

The iconic arch over the main stand of Athletic's San Mamés Stadium (which originally supported its roof) was preserved in the ground's demolition in 2013 and moved in several pieces to Lezama, where it was installed at the side of the Field 2 used by the reserves and women's team, with a small area of spectator seating added below.

The complex also features busts of iconic Athletic players Zarra and Piru Gainza.

References

External links
Official website
Estadios de España 

Athletic Bilbao
Football venues in the Basque Country (autonomous community)
Lezama
Buildings and structures in Biscay
Sports venues completed in 1971
Sport in Biscay
SD Amorebieta
1971 establishments in Spain
Athletic Club Femenino